Sir Anthony Knyvett (circa 1486 to 1549) held the office of Black Rod in the English parliament from 1536 to 1543.

References 

Ushers of the Black Rod
1480s births
1549 deaths